Janówek Pierwszy  is a village in the administrative district of Gmina Wieliszew, within Legionowo County, Masovian Voivodeship, in east-central Poland.

In 2005 the village had a population of 520.

References

Villages in Legionowo County